is a 2016 Japanese historical drama television series and the 55th NHK taiga drama. The series is named after the Sanada Maru, a fortification defended by Sanada during the Siege of Osaka in 1615. Written by Kōki Mitani, it stars Masato Sakai as the samurai Sanada Nobushige. It premiered on January 10, 2016 and concluded on December 18, 2016.

Due to declining viewership for taiga dramas in recent years, NHK strengthened its marketing push for Sanada Maru as compared with its previous taiga dramas.

Plot
The drama focuses on the history of the Sanada clan during the Sengoku period in Japan, and in particular on Sanada Nobushige, who would go on to become one of the legendary commanders of the period.

Cast

Sanada clan
Masato Sakai as Sanada Nobushige, also known as Sanada Yukimura
Yo Oizumi as Sanada Nobuyuki, Nobushige's older brother 
Masao Kusakari as Sanada Masayuki, Nobushige's father
Masami Nagasawa as Kiri, Nobushige's childhood friend
Yoshino Kimura as Matsu, Nobushige's sister
Atsuko Takahata as Kaoru, Nobushige's mother
Mitsuko Kusabue as Tori, Nobushige's grandmother
Susumu Terajima as Ideura Masasuke
Takashi Fujii as Sasuke, a ninja in the service of Nobushige
Takeo Nakahara as Takanashi Naiki, Kiri's father
Takahiro Fujimoto as Hotta Sakubei
Haru Kuroki as Ume, Nobushige's first wife 
Yuri Tsunematsu as Sue (teen), Nobushige and Ume's daughter
Seishuu Uragami as Sanada Daisuke, Nobushige and Haru's son
Nanako Ōde as Ume, Nobushige and Haru's daughter
Yukino Kishii as Taka, Nobushige's third wife
Takaya Sakoda as Yazawa "Sanjūrō" Yoriyuki
Wataru Takagi as Oyamada Shigemasa, Matsu's husband
Satomi Nagano as Kō, Nobuyuki's first wife 
Hideo Kurihara as Sanada Nobutada, younger brother of Masayuki
Toshiki Ayata as Yazawa Yoritsuna
Hiroki Konno as Yohachi
Yasuhiro Ōno as Kawara Tsunaie
Masashi Ōyama as Sanada Nobumasa
Ryōhei Hirota as Sanada Nobuyoshi
Akiko Yagi as Ono Otsū
Ryō Katō as Ishiai Jūzō, Sue's husband
Hanamaru Hakata as Saizō
Kunihiro Matsumura as Seikai Nyūdō
Tomohiro Waki as Isa Nyūdō
Yoshiaki Umegaki as Kamanosuke
Taku Suzuki as Jūzō
Hideto Iwai as Jinpachi
Yūma Yamoto as Rokurō

Tokugawa clan
Seiyō Uchino as Tokugawa Ieyasu, Nobushige's most powerful enemy
Masaomi Kondō as Honda Masanobu, a strategist for Ieyasu
Gen Hoshino as Tokugawa Hidetada
Seiko Niizuma as Ogō, Hidetada's wife
Yuki Saito as Lady Acha
Hiroshi Fujioka as Honda Tadakatsu, Nobuyuki's father-in-law 
Yō Yoshida as Inahime, also known as Komatsuhime, Tadakatsu's daughter, Nobuyuki's wife & Nobushige's sister in-law
Masayuki Itō as Ishikawa Kazumasa
Kenji Hamatani as Hattori Hanzō
Kōichi Ōhori as Torii Mototada
Takaaki Itō as Honda Masazumi

Pro-Tokugawa daimyōs

Takuya Ōga as Kuroda Nagamasa
Macchu Saitō as Asano Yoshinaga
Isao Sano as Hachisuka Iemasa
Seiji Hino as Tōdō Takatora

Toyotomi clan
Fumiyo Kohinata as Toyotomi Hideyoshi
Kyōka Suzuki as Nei, Hideyoshi's wife
Yūko Takeuchi as Yodo-dono, Hideyoshi's concubine
Taishi Nakagawa as Toyotomi Hideyori, Hideyoshi's son
Sera Ishida as young Hideyori
Mei Nagano as Senhime, Hideyori's wife
Koji Yamamoto as Ishida Mitsunari, the commander of the Western army in the Battle of Sekigahara
Kataoka Ainosuke VI as Ōtani Yoshitsugu, Mitsunari's ally, Nobushige's father-in-law 
Mayu Matsuoka as Haru, also known as Chikurin-in, Yoshitsugu's daughter, Nobushige's wife
Takamasa Tamaki as Shima Sakon
Katsura Bunshi VI as Sen no Rikyū
Takashi Kobayashi as Katagiri Katsumoto, negotiator with the Tokugawa shogunate
Shinya Niiro as Toyotomi Hidetsugu
Hirofumi Arai as Katō Kiyomasa, loyal vassal to the Toyotomi clan
Motoki Fukami as Fukushima Masanori
Yōsuke Asari as Kobayakawa Hideaki
Kento Saitō as young Hideaki
Rie Minemura as Lady Ōkura-kyō
Yoshimasa Kondo as Hirano Nagayasu
Tomohiko Imai as Ōno Harunaga
Masa Yamada as Naka, Hideyoshi's mother
Tetsuya Chiba as Toyotomi Hidenaga
Michiko Shimizu as Asahi-hime
Nahoko Yoshimoto as Uta, Mitsunari's wife
Arisa Nakajima as Yoshino Tayū
Kazuya Takahashi as Ukita Hideie
Mitsuki Horikoshi as Toyotomi Hidekatsu
Ryō Mitsuya as Toyotomi Hideyasu
Hirara Hayasaka as Toyotomi Tsurumatsu
Masayuki Kizu as Natsuka Masaie
Shinya Kote as Ban Naoyuki, aka Ban Dan'emon
Jun Inoue as Oda Urakusai
Voice Yoshida as Tachibana Gonza
Shoko Haida as Ohatsu, Yodo's sister
Ben Hiura as Ōsumi Yozaemon
"The Seven Generals of Hideyori"
Kenji Anan as Chōsokabe Morichika
Kenichi Okamoto as Mōri Katsunaga
Show Aikawa as Gotō Matabei
Kensaku Kobayashi as Akashi Teruzumi
Shunya Shiraishi as Kimura Shigenari
Kozo Takeda as Ōno Harufusa

Uesugi clan
Kenichi Endō as Uesugi Kagekatsu
Shingo Murakami as Naoe Kanetsugu, Kagekatsu’s right‐hand man
Yasuyuki Maekawa as Kasuga Nobutatsu

Later Hōjō clan
Masanobu Takashima as Hōjō Ujimasa
Yoshihiko Hosoda as Hōjō Ujinao
Atsushi Yamanishi as Itabeoka Kōsetsusai

Shinano Province
Masahiko Nishimura as Muroga Masatake
Kenichi Ishii as Kiso Yoshimasa

Takeda clan
Takehiro Hira as Takeda Katsuyori
Takaaki Enoki as Anayama Baisetsu
Kunishirō Hayashi as Takeda Shingen (Ghost)
Yōichi Nukumizu as Oyamada Nobushige
Takuo Inari as Atobe Katsusuke
Kōji Hatta as Oyamada Hachizaemon

Oda clan
Kōtarō Yoshida as Oda Nobunaga
Yasunori Danta as Takigawa Kazumasu
Reo Tamaoki as Oda Nobutada
Hisafumi Iwashita as Akechi Mitsuhide
Kenji Matsuda as Nagasaki Motoie
Tanida Ayumi as Mori Nagayoshi

Date clan
Tomoharu Hasegawa as Date Masamune
Asahi Yoshida as Katakura Kagetsuna

Maeda clan
Katsuya Kobayashi as Maeda Toshiie, a member of the council of Five Elders
Masayuki Yorozu as Maeda Toshinaga

Mōri clan
Naoki Asaji as Mōri Terumoto, a member of the council of Five Elders

Hosokawa clan
Toshihiro Yashiba as Hosokawa Tadaoki
Manami Hashimoto as Hosokawa Gracia

Others
Matsumoto Kōshirō IX as Luzon Sukezaemon (from 1978 taiga drama Ōgon no Hibi)
Sylvia Grab as Izumo no Okuni
Kenji Mizuhashi as Kichizō
Jun Uemoto as Seikan
Ryō Kinomoto as Chōbei
Makoto Miyashita as Takemoto Gidayū
Makoto Tsuchiya
Kazuya Kojima as Muroga Kyūdayū, the son of Muroga Masatake

Production
Production Credits
Music – Takayuki Hattori
Titling – Shūhei Hasado
Historical research – Motoki Kuroda, Masaru Hirayama, Kazuhiro Marushima
Architectural research – Kiyoshi Hirai
Clothing research – Hiroaki Koizumi
Sword fight arranger - Kunishirō Nakagawa

Casting
NHK chose to cast Masato Sakai for the lead role of Sanada Nobushige, a samurai of the Sengoku period. Minoru Kubota of the Yomiuri Shimbun assumes that this is in part to increase viewership for the historical series after years of declining audience numbers for taiga dramas, as Sakai was a popular actor in the dramas he previously starred in.

Marketing
Due to the decline in viewers of NHK's taiga dramas, which is especially seen in the historically low ratings of preceding taiga drama Hana Moyu in 2015, the public broadcaster strengthened its effort to market Sanada Maru in order for viewership to increase. Locations that were to be depicted in the taiga drama were featured in travel-themed programs such as Tsurube's Salute to Families and Bura Tamori, which also featured actors from Sanada Maru as guests. History-themed documentaries and discussion programs covered the historical background of the drama. Lead actor Sakai was sent out by NHK to major media outlets for interviews, though he was found to be uncooperative in many of them, as questions would focus on his personal life instead of his new role in the drama.

TV schedule

Soundtracks
Sanada Maru NHK Taiga Drama Original Soundtrack (February 24, 2016)
Sanada Maru NHK Taiga Drama Original Soundtrack II (July 20, 2016)
Sanada Maru NHK Taiga Drama Original Soundtrack III (November 9, 2016)
Sanada Maru NHK Taiga Drama Original Soundtrack: The Best (December 21, 2016)

Accolades

See also

Sanada Maru (fortification)
Sengoku period
 Sanada Taiheiki

References

External links
Official Site

Taiga drama
2016 Japanese television series debuts
2016 Japanese television series endings
Cultural depictions of Sanada clan
Cultural depictions of Akechi Mitsuhide
Cultural depictions of Date Masamune
Cultural depictions of Oda Nobunaga
Cultural depictions of samurai
Cultural depictions of Tokugawa Ieyasu
Cultural depictions of Toyotomi Hideyoshi
Television shows written by Kôki Mitani
Television series set in the 16th century
Television series set in the 17th century
Television shows set in Nagano Prefecture
Television shows set in Wakayama Prefecture
Television shows set in Osaka